"New Mistake" is a song by American power pop group Jellyfish, released as the second single from their 1993second and final studio album, Spilt Milk (1993).

Track listings 
European 7-inch single (CUSS 11)
 "New Mistake" – 4:02
 "He's My Best Friend" – 3:44

European CD1 single (CUSDG 11)
 "New Mistake" – 4:02
 "He's My Best Friend" – 3:44
 "All Is Forgiven" (demo) – 4:09
 "Russian Hill" (demo) – 4:43

European CD2 single (CUSCD 11)
 "New Mistake" – 4:02
 "Sebrina, Paste And Plato" (demo) – 2:12
 "The Man I Used to Be" (demo) – 4:23
 "Bedspring Kiss" (demo) – 4:47

US CD single (V25H-12663)
 "New Mistake" – 4:02
 "Ignorance Is Bliss" – 3:58
 "Worthless Heart" (demo) – 3:06
 "Baby's Coming Back" (live) – 3:05

Charts

References

External links 
 

1993 songs
1993 singles
Charisma Records singles
Jellyfish (band) songs
Song recordings produced by Albhy Galuten
Song recordings produced by Jack Joseph Puig
Songs written by Andy Sturmer
Songs written by Roger Joseph Manning Jr.